Chym-Korgon is a village in the Chüy Region of Kyrgyzstan. Its population was 4,667 in 2021.

Climate
Chym-Korgon has a humid continental climate (Köppen climate classification: Dsa).

References

Populated places in Chüy Region